A116 may refer to:
 A116 road (England), a road connecting Manor Park, London and Wanstead
 A116 road (Malaysia), a road in Perak connecting Sungai Lesong and Temoh
 A116 road (Russia), a road in Russia connecting Soltsi and Veliky Novgorod